National Institution Cultural Center Trajko Prokopiev - Kumanovo abbreviated NICC Trajko Prokopiev is a cultural center in Kumanovo, North Macedonia. It holds the name of the local composer Trajko Prokopiev (1909-1979). Former name was Cultural Home "Josip Broz Tito" (.

Events

See also

 Museum Kumanovo
 Contemporary Art Museum of Macedonia
 Holocaust Memorial Center for the Jews of Macedonia
 Memorial House of Mother Teresa
 Museum of Macedonia
 Museum of the City of Skopje
 Museum of the Macedonian Struggle (Skopje)
 National Gallery of Macedonia

References

External links
 Official Facebook Page
 Article about the "Center" from 2007

Buildings and structures in Kumanovo
Cultural organizations based in North Macedonia